The Oak Leaf Trail (formerly 76 Bike Trail) is a paved  multi-use recreational trail system which encircles Milwaukee County, Wisconsin. Clearly marked trail segments connect all of the major parks in the Milwaukee County Park System.

History 
Early bicycling advocate Harold "Zip" Morgan first conceived and laid out a  trail in 1939. The route made its way around the edge of the county and through natural resource corridors found along the rivers and lakefront. Three decades later the trail was officially established by the Milwaukee County Park Commission, and in 1966 construction of the parkland trails began. In 1976, it became known as the 76 Bike Trail. The trail was briefly renamed to the 76 Multi-Use Trail in 1995 before being renamed to the Oak Leaf Trail in 1996.

In September 2018, to improve wayfinding, sections of the trail were assigned colors and branch line names.

Description 

The trail system is composed of several intersecting lines. Scenery along the Oak Leaf Trail varies from woodland parks, nature reserves, and a wildlife corridor along the lakefront, to urban industrial settings in Milwaukee's downtown area.

Menomonee River Line 

It stretches from Doyne Park in the south to Dretzka Park in the north.

Kinnickinnic Line 

Following the Kinnickinnic River for most of its length, it turns north at each end to connect to the Milwaukee Art Museum in the east and Hart Park in the west. The Kinnickinnic River Trail intersects with the line at multiple points.

The line was established in 1988 as the 76 East-West Trail, spanning  and following much of the same route as it does today.

Root River Line 

It stretches from the Milwaukee County Sports Complex in the south to Hoyt Park in the north, connecting with the New Berlin Trail, Brookfield Greenway, and Hank Aaron State Trail along the way. Part of this line is included in U.S. Bicycle Route 30.

The line was first established as the  Root River Trail Extension in 2006.

Oak Creek Line 

It branches from the South Shore Line in Abendschein Park in the north, then continues south until bending west to follow part of the Root River.

South Shore Line 

It stretches from Cupertino Park in the north to Bender Park in the south.

Milwaukee River Line 

It stretches from Juneau Park in the south to Brown Deer Park in the north, connecting with the Beerline Trail along the way.

The Zip Line 

It branches from the Milwaukee River Line in Estabrook Park and continues north until it connects with Kohl Park and the Ozaukee Interurban Trail.

In 2015, a  gap in the line between Hampton Avenue and Mill Road was filled.

Drexel Connector 

It provides an east-west connection among the Menomonee River Line, the Zip Line, and the Milwaukee River Line.

Bradley Connector 

It provides an east-west connection between the Oak Creek Line and the Root River Line.

Lake Line 

It stretches from the Milwaukee Art Museum in the south to Lake Park in the north.

The line was established in 1967 as a  bicycle-only pilot trail that started at McKinley Park, traveled north to Lake Park, made a loop, and traveled south until ending near the North Point Water Tower.

Whitnall Loop 

It branches from the Root River Line to provide a loop route through Whitnall Park.

Gallery

See also
 Parks of Milwaukee

References

External links 
 Milwaukee County Parks

Wisconsin culture
Transportation in Wisconsin
Transportation in Milwaukee
Protected areas of Milwaukee County, Wisconsin
Hiking trails in Wisconsin
Geography of Milwaukee
Tourist attractions in Milwaukee
South Side, Milwaukee